The canton of Thonon-les-Bains is an administrative division of the Haute-Savoie department, southeastern France. It was created at the French canton reorganisation which came into effect in March 2015. Its seat is in Thonon-les-Bains.

It consists of the following communes:

Allinges
Armoy
Bellevaux
Cervens
Draillant
Lullin
Lyaud
Orcier
Perrignier
Reyvroz
Thonon-les-Bains
Vailly

References

Cantons of Haute-Savoie